Unión Buenos Aires was a Peruvian football club, located in the city of Callao.

The club was founded with the name of club Unión Buenos Aires and played in Primera Division Peruana from 1926 Peruvian Primera División until 1931 Peruvian Primera División.

The club was runner-up of the national tournament in 1927.

The club participated in the Liga Distrital de Callao until 1990.

Achievements
Primera División Peruana: 0
 Runner-up (1): 1927

See also
List of football clubs in Peru
Peruvian football league system

External links
 RSSSF - Peru - List of Champions
 Peruvian football seasons

Association football clubs established in 1917
Football clubs in Lima